Zdenka Gašparac (born 5 July 1949) is a Croatian former swimmer. She competed at the 1968 Summer Olympics and the 1972 Summer Olympics for Yugoslavia.

References

1949 births
Living people
Croatian female swimmers
Yugoslav female swimmers
Olympic swimmers of Yugoslavia
Swimmers at the 1968 Summer Olympics
Swimmers at the 1972 Summer Olympics
Sportspeople from Zadar